Bingham Township is the name of several places in the U.S. state of Michigan:

 Bingham Township, Clinton County, Michigan
 Bingham Township, Huron County, Michigan
 Bingham Township, Leelanau County, Michigan

See also 
 Bingham Township (disambiguation)

Michigan township disambiguation pages